Onesime Eugene "Gene" Vadeboncoeur (September 5, 1859 – April 16, 1893) was a Major League Baseball player. Vadeboncoeur played for Philadelphia Quakers in the 1884 season. He played in four games, collecting three hits in 14 at-bats, totaling a .214 batting average. He is the first native of Quebec to play in Major League Baseball.

External links

1859 births
1893 deaths
19th-century baseball players
Baseball people from Quebec
Canadian expatriate baseball players in the United States
Boston Blues players
Easton (minor league baseball) players
People from Louiseville
People from Mauricie
Philadelphia Quakers players
Major League Baseball players from Canada
Peoria Reds players
York White Roses players
Lawrence (minor league baseball) players
Haverhill (minor league baseball) players